The Cabo Branco Lighthouse is located on the cliffs of Cabo Branco, in the district of the same name, in João Pessoa, Paraíba, Brazil. It is one of the most important and visited places in João Pessoa.

History
The tower is painted white with a horizontal black strip immediately above the wings. It is not a true lighthouse as it lacks a light, but rather a type of navigation marker.

The tower was inaugurated in April 1972, during the government of Emilio Medici. The beacon of "Cape White" has a triangular shape with wings, the only one like it in the world. The architects had the intention to represent a sisal plant in the design of the lighthouse. Sisal has been one of the most lasting economic mainstays in the state of Paraiba.

See also
List of lighthouses in Brazil

References

External links
  Centro de Sinalização Náutica Almirante Moraes Rego 
Video on Cabo Branco lighthouse (Farol do Cabo Branco)

Lighthouses completed in 1972
Lighthouses in Brazil
Buildings and structures in Paraíba